"The House of the Rising Sun" is an American folk song.

House of the Rising Sun may also refer to:
 House of the Rising Sun (album), a 1976 album by American jazz drummer Idris Muhammad
 "House of the Rising Sun" (Lost), a 2004 episode of the American television series Lost
 House of the Rising Sun (film), a 2011 film

 Imperial House of Japan